Zhangixalus aurantiventris (common names: orange-belly treefrog, orange-bellied treefrog) is a species of frog in the family Rhacophoridae. It is endemic to Taiwan. It is known from scattered localities across Taiwan at low to mid altitudes.

Description
Adult males in the type series measure  in snout–vent length. In a population in Taitung County, adult males measured  and adult females  in snout–vent length; mean male and female body mass were 8 and 15 grams, respectively. The snout is short and roundish. The tympanum is nearly circular; supratympanic fold is present. The fingers and the toes are webbed and bear discs, the former larger than the latter. Skin is smooth. The dorsum is dark green; pale yellowish spots may be present. The lips are white. The venter is orange-red. The iris is plain yellow; the pupil is vertical.

The male advertisement call sounds like a low-pitched "gree", lasting about 0.4 seconds.

Habitat and ecology
Zhangixalus aurantiventris occurs in primary broad-leaf forests at low and mid altitudes. Breeding takes place in tree holes and buckets.

Conservation
Zhangixalus aurantiventris is a rare species. It is believed to be on decline, but reasons for this are not known—its habitat is not considered threatened. It is present in Fushan Nature Reserve and Lichia Wildlife Refuge. It is classified as "endangered" in the IUCN Red List of Threatened Species and in the Taiwan Wildlife Conservation Act.

References

aurantiventris
Amphibians of Taiwan
Endemic fauna of Taiwan
Amphibians described in 1994
Taxa named by Kuang-yang Lue
Taxonomy articles created by Polbot